The following article presents a summary of the 2020 football (soccer) season in Brazil, which is the 119th season of competitive football in the country.

Campeonato Brasileiro Série A

The 2020 Campeonato Brasileiro Série A started on August 8, 2020, and ended on February 25, 2021.

Athletico Paranaense
Atlético Goianiense
Atlético Mineiro
Bahia
Botafogo
Ceará
Corinthians
Coritiba
Flamengo
Fluminense
Fortaleza
Goiás
Grêmio
Internacional
Palmeiras
Red Bull Bragantino
Santos
São Paulo
Sport
Vasco da Gama

Flamengo won the league.

Relegation
The four worst placed teams, Vasco da Gama, Goiás, Coritiba and Botafogo, were relegated to the following year's second level.

Campeonato Brasileiro Série B

The 2020 Campeonato Brasileiro Série B started on August 7, 2020, and ended on January 29, 2021.

América Mineiro
Avaí
Botafogo (SP)
Brasil de Pelotas
Chapecoense
Confiança
CRB
Cruzeiro
CSA
Cuiabá
Figueirense
Guarani
Juventude
Náutico
Oeste
Operário Ferroviário
Paraná
Ponte Preta
Sampaio Corrêa
Vitória

Chapecoense won the league.

Promotion
The four best placed teams, Chapecoense, América Mineiro, Juventude and Cuiabá, were promoted to the following year's first level.

Relegation
The four worst placed teams, Figueirense, Paraná, Botafogo-SP and Oeste, were relegated to the following year's third level.

Campeonato Brasileiro Série C

The 2020 Campeonato Brasileiro Série C started on August 8, 2020, and ended on January 30, 2021.

Boa Esporte
Botafogo (PB)
Brusque
Criciúma
Ferroviário
Imperatriz
Ituano
Jacuipense
Londrina
Manaus
Paysandu
Remo
Santa Cruz
São Bento
São José
Tombense
Treze
Vila Nova
Volta Redonda
Ypiranga

The Campeonato Brasileiro Série C final was played between Vila Nova and Remo.

Vila Nova won the league after beating Remo.

Promotion
The four best placed teams, Vila Nova, Remo, Londrina and Brusque, were promoted to the following year's second level.

Relegation
The four worst placed teams, Treze, São Bento, Boa Esporte and Imperatriz, were relegated to the following year's fourth level.

Campeonato Brasileiro Série D

The 2020 Campeonato Brasileiro Série D started on September 6, 2020, and ended on February 6, 2021.

ABC
Afogados
Águia Negra
Altos
América de Natal
Aparecidense
Aquidauanense
Atlético Acreano
Atlético Cajazeirense
Atlético de Alagoinhas
Bahia de Feira
Bangu
Baré
Bragantino (PA)
Brasiliense
Cabofriense
Caldense
Campinense
FC Cascavel
Caxias
Central
CEOV
Coruripe
Fast Clube
Ferroviária
Floresta
Freipaulistano
Galvez
Gama
Globo
Goianésia
Goiânia
Guarany de Sobral
Independente
Itabaiana
Jaciobá
Ji-Paraná
Joinville
Juventude Samas
Marcílio Dias
Mirassol
Moto Club
Nacional (AM)
Nacional (PR)
Novorizontino
Palmas
Pelotas
Portuguesa (RJ)
Potiguar de Mossoró
Real Noroeste
Rio Branco
River
Salgueiro
Santos (AP)
São Caetano
São Luiz
São Raimundo (RR)
Sinop
Tocantinópolis
Toledo
Tubarão
Tupynambás
União Rondonópolis
Vilhenense
Villa Nova
Vitória (ES)
Vitória da Conquista
Ypiranga (AP)

The Campeonato Brasileiro Série D final was played between Mirassol and Floresta.

Mirassol won the league after defeating Floresta.

Promotion
The four best placed teams, Mirassol, Floresta, Novorizontino and Altos, were promoted to the following year's third level.

Super cup

Supercopa do Brasil

The 2020 Supercopa do Brasil was played on February 16, 2020 between Flamengo and Athletico Paranaense.

Flamengo won the super cup after defeating Athletico Paranaense.

Domestic cups

Copa do Brasil

The 2020 Copa do Brasil started on February 5, 2020, and ended on March 7, 2021. The Copa do Brasil final was played between Palmeiras and Grêmio.

Palmeiras won the cup after defeating Grêmio.

Copa do Nordeste

The competition features 16 clubs from the Northeastern region. It started on January 21, 2020, and ended on August 4, 2020.The Copa do Nordeste final was played between Ceará and Bahia.

Ceará won the cup after defeating Bahia.

Copa Verde

The competition featured 24 clubs from the North and Central-West regions, including two teams from Espírito Santo. It started on 20 January 2021, and ended on 24 February 2021. The Copa Verde final was played between Brasiliense and Remo.

Brasiliense won the cup after defeating Remo.

State championship champions

State cup competition champions

Notes

Youth competition champions

(1) The Copa Nacional do Espírito Santo Sub-17, between 2008 and 2012, was named Copa Brasil Sub-17. The similar named Copa do Brasil Sub-17 is organized by the Brazilian Football Confederation and it was first played in 2013.

Brazilian clubs in international competitions

Brazil national team
The following table lists all the games played by the Brazilian national team in official competitions and friendly matches during 2020.

FIFA World Cup qualification

Women's football

Campeonato Brasileiro de Futebol Feminino Série A1

The 2020 Campeonato Brasileiro de Futebol Feminino Série A1 started on February 8, 2020, and ended on December 6, 2020.

Audax
Corinthians
Cruzeiro
Ferroviária
Flamengo/Marinha
Grêmio
Internacional
Iranduba
Kindermann/Avaí
Minas/ICESP
Palmeiras
Ponte Preta
Santos
São José
São Paulo
Vitória

The Campeonato Brasileiro de Futebol Feminino Série A1 final was played between Corinthians and Kindermann/Avaí.

Corinthians won the league after defeating Kindermann/Avaí.

Relegation
The four worst placed teams, Iranduba, Audax, Ponte Preta and Vitória, were relegated to the following year's second level.

Campeonato Brasileiro de Futebol Feminino Série A2

The 2020 Campeonato Brasileiro de Futebol Feminino Série A2 started on March 14, 2020, and ended on January 31, 2021.

3B da Amazônia
América Mineiro
Athletico Paranaense
Atlético Acreano
Atlético Goianiense
Atlético Mineiro
Auto Esporte
Bahia
Botafogo
Brasil de Farroupilha
Ceará
Chapecoense
Cruzeiro (RN)
ESMAC
Fluminense
Fortaleza
Foz Cataratas
Goiás
Juventude Timonense
Juventus
Napoli
Náutico
Operário Ltda.
Oratório
Real Ariquemes
Real Brasília
Santos Dumont
São Francisco
São Valério
SERC/UCDB
Sport
Tiradentes
Toledo/Coritiba
UDA
Vasco da Gama
Vila Nova (ES)

The Campeonato Brasileiro de Futebol Feminino Série A2 final was played between Napoli and Botafogo.

Napoli won the league after defeating Botafogo.

Promotion
The four best placed teams, Napoli, Botafogo, Bahia and Real Brasília, were promoted to the following year's first level.

Domestic competition champions

State cup competition champions

Youth competition champions

Brazilian clubs in international competitions

National team
The following table lists all the games played by the Brazil women's national football team in official competitions and friendly matches during 2020.

The Brazil women's national football team competed in the following competitions in 2020:

Friendlies

2020 Tournoi de France

1. The match was played behind closed doors due to the COVID-19 pandemic in France.

References

External links
 Brazilian competitions at RSSSF

 
Seasons in Brazilian football